Gymnodiptychus dybowskii (common name: naked osman) is a species of cyprinid in the genus Gymnodiptychus. It lives in Asia. It has a maximum length of 45.0 cm (1 foot 5.7 inches) and a common length of 23.0 cm (9.0 inches), and its heaviest recorded weight is 3.0 kg (6 lb 9.8oz).

References

Cyprinidae
Cyprinid fish of Asia